Nisar Nasik (15 February 1943 – 3 July 2019) was a Pakistani poet.

Career
He was born in Rawalpindi, Pakistan in 1943 and used to work for both Radio Pakistan and Pakistan Television. He was credited with writing the song "Dil Dil Pakistan", a highly popular patriotic song by the musical band Vital Signs first released in 1987.

Awards and recognition
Pakistan Television awarded him the Lifetime Achievement Award for his contributions in Urdu literature.

Bibliography
He wrote in Urdu and Punjabi languages. He also wrote two books: 
Chothi Simat Ka Musafir
 Dil Dil Pakistan.

Death
Nisar Nasik died in Rawalpindi, Pakistan on 3 July 2019 after a protracted illness with many health issues including diabetes, amnesia and high blood pressure.

References

1943 births
2019 deaths
People from Rawalpindi
Urdu-language poets from Pakistan
Punjabi-language poets
Poets from Punjab, Pakistan
PTV Award winners